Theodoros Zagorakis (born 27 October 1971) is a Greek politician and former professional footballer who played as a midfielder. He was the captain of Greece that won UEFA Euro 2004, and was also president of PAOK. He was named the Greek Male Athlete of the Year in 2004. He was elected as a Greek MEP at the May 2014 European Parliament election. He was also the president of the HFF from March to September 2021.

Club career

Kavala

Zagorakis was a central midfielder who could also play on the right side of midfield. He started his career with Kavala in 1988, the club that also produced Zisis Vryzas, with whom he became close friends. He was an important part of helping the team get into the Beta Ethniki.

PAOK

In the 1992–93 season, Zagorakis left Kavala as a winter transfer to join PAOK, part of a string of star transfers made that season. He played for PAOK until December 1997, and also captained the squad in his last two seasons. He rarely missed a league derby and scored important goals, particularly in 1994–95 when he struck four, his best-ever tally.

Leicester City

Zagorakis left for English club Leicester City the following winter and signed for Martin O'Neill's side in 1998. While in England, he took part in two consecutive League Cup finals at Wembley Stadium, losing the first against Tottenham Hotspur in 1999 and defeating Tranmere Rovers in the second, though he was an unused substitute in the latter. Zagorakis will always be fondly known by Leicester fans for his sheer determination in midfield and also his goalkeeping cameo against Crystal Palace, in a 3–3 draw, where he went in goal after Pegguy Arphexad and then Tim Flowers went off injured.

AEK Athens

Zagorakis was disappointed with Leicester manager Martin O'Neill's reluctance to use him regularly and decided to return to Greece in 2000. He moved to AEK Athens, and played alongside fellow countrymen such as Michalis Kapsis, Vasilios Lakis, Demis Nikolaidis and Vasilios Tsiartas. He formed an excellent duo in midfield with both Akis Zikos and Kostas Katsouranis, helping with his game in the defensive part and also in the organization of the offense, where he also competed at times as a captain. A goal with AEK was against Inter Milan at Giuseppe Meazza with a great shot for the round of 16 of the UEFA Cup. With AEK, Zagorakis won the Greek Cup in 2002 against rivals Olympiacos. Zagorakis, during his last season in AEK, has accepted a reduced pay-off which is reported to be £220,000."He showed he genuinely has the club's best interests at heart and is free to take up any of the great offers from teams abroad," said a club statement. In the summer of 2004, having the best moment of his career at the Euro in Portugal and with AEK in a difficult administrative situation, he left the team.

Bologna

On 14 July 2004, he left AEK Athens for Bologna, signing a two-year contract worth €1.5 million per year. Zagorakis–who was voted player of the tournament in Portugal–was released by AEK Athens and joined Bologna on a Bosman free transfer. "Zagorakis is our Greek Baggio", Bologna owner Giuseppe Gazzoni Frascara told the newspaper. In 2004–05, Zagorakis was a regular feature in the squad, but the team found itself relegated to Serie B after a play-out series against Parma. In the following summer, he was released from the team as they couldn't afford his payroll under the new conditions.

Return to PAOK

The Player of the Tournament at UEFA Euro 2004 will arrive in Thessaloniki to sign the deal with PAOK. The midfielder was released by Bologna following the Italian team's relegation from Serie A, and rejoins one of his old clubs. Zagorakis eventually signed a two-year contract with PAOK for €700,000 a year. When Zagorakis landed at Makedonia Airport in Thessaloniki, 7,000 supporters were there to welcome him back. His return however coincided with a turbulent period, with the club many financial and administrative problems. On 28 May 2007, after the fifth Greek Super League All-Star Game, Zagorakis announced his retirement from professional football.

International career

Zagorakis received his first cap for Greece on 7 September 1994, against the Faroe Islands. He scored his first goal against Denmark in 2006 World Cup qualifying, in Athens, while earning his 101st cap. Numbering 120 caps, Zagorakis was Greece's all-time leader in international games played until 12 October 2012, when Giorgos Karagounis made his 121st appearance for the national team. He earned his 100th against Kazakhstan on 17 November 2004, and was the team's longest-serving captain.

Zagorakis played an important role in Greece's win in the 2004 European Championships, and was named the Player of the Tournament by UEFA and consequently he was in the Team of the Tournament. FIFA named Zagorakis as a contender for the 2004 FIFA World Player of the Year award (he finished in 17th place alongside Spain's and Real Madrid's legend, Raúl), as well as UEFA named him for the 2004 Ballon d'Or award (he finished in fifth place), behind the likes of Ronaldinho (third place) and Thierry Henry (fourth place). He holds the record of most consecutive matches (57) (except one in 2006 because of injury) of the national team (due to either injury or not selection) since his first cap in a period of 12 years.

After 12 full playing years as the captain for Greece, Zagorakis announced his retirement from international football on 5 October 2006. More specifically, Greece captain was considering retiring after his team's European championship qualifier against Norway in Athens on 2 October 2006, has also been called up for the match against Bosnia four days later, officials said.
On 22 August 2007, however, he played for the last time with the national side, in a special friendly match against Spain in Toumba Stadium, Salonica. He played for about 15 minutes and was then replaced by Giannis Goumas, receiving an applause by fans singing his name.

PAOK presidency

Following his retirement as a footballer, after many widespread rumours, it was announced that he was to become PAOK's new president, on 18 June 2007.

The club had been in dire financial straits for several years. Zagorakis undertook to sort out finances by attracting investors, increasing revenue and mobilising the club's fan base. In his unifying first statement he said: "The strength of PAOK lies in its supporters, its fans...I would have not made this decision" (to retire from playing and assume administration) "if i did not love my club. The situation for PAOK is very difficult and I will not try to hide its problems; instead I will do all I can to solve the pressing financial issues."

Soon he set about restructuring the club's debt and team, and recruited former teammate Zisis Vryzas as technical director. As of late 2008, PAOK has been able to pay off most of its accumulated debt, seen a steady increase in ticket sales and advertising revenue, and team performance on the field has improved considerably, under the coaching of Portuguese manager Fernando Santos.

On 15 December 2008, Zagorakis announced a major issue of new stock by the club, valued at €22.3 million. He appealed to small investors and stated that, although it is unlikely that the entire sum could be covered in a worldwide crisis environment, he felt confident that the expected influx of capital would enable PAOK finally to put its past problems behind and focus on future growth.

On 8 October 2009, Zagorakis surprised fans and press alike by announcing his decision to quit the presidency. In a short announcement on the club's official website, he cited that personal problems have led him to this decision. He was rapidly replaced by his close friend Zisis Vryzas.

Nevertheless, he kept close contact with his former associates, and also frequently attended the club's home games alongside Vryzas. Zagorakis finally changed his mind and on 20 January he reprised his position as president, with Vryzas stepping down to assume the post of vice-president.

In January 2012 Zagorakis resigned as president after the sale of Vieirinha for financial reasons provoked a supporters' protest.

Style of play

Zagorakis was described by UEFA.com as a "combative, industrious defensive midfielder with a powerful right-foot shot".

Personal life

Zagorakis was featured on the cover of the Greek edition of FIFA 2001.

Political career

Zagorakis is looking to kick-off a new career in politics by becoming a Member of the European Parliament (MEP). He was a New Democracy candidate for the European Parliament in the elections of 25 May 2014. He was elected as an MEP and became a member of the European People's Party (Christian Democrats). He was unveiled as one of the party's hopefuls by the Greek Prime Minister, Antonis Samaras.

In January 2020, a Committee of Professional Sports (with members placed by Sports Minister Lefteris Avgenakis) proposed the relegation of PAOK FC and Xanthi FC. Zagorakis stated that he could no longer be MEP for New Democracy after this. The party's leader and PM Kyriakos Mitsotakis decided his deletion. Several MP's said that Zagorakis was elected in European Parliament to represent Greece, not PAOK.

Career statistics

Club

International

 Scores and results list Greece's goal tally first, score column indicates score after each Zagorakis goal.

Honours

Leicester City
League Cup: 1999–2000

AEK Athens
Greek Cup: 2001–02

Greece
UEFA European Championship: 2004

Individual
UEFA Euro 2004: Player of the tournament
UEFA Euro 2004: Team of the Tournament
UEFA Euro 2004 Final: Man of the Match
Greek Male Athlete of the Year: 2004
PAOK MVP of the Season: 1996–1997

See also
List of men's footballers with 100 or more international caps

References

External links

Official website 

FootballDatabase profile and stats

1971 births
Living people
Greek Macedonians
AEK Athens F.C. players
Bologna F.C. 1909 players
Premier League players
Greek footballers
Greek expatriate footballers
Expatriate footballers in Italy
Expatriate footballers in England
Leicester City F.C. players
Kavala F.C. players
Serie A players
PAOK FC players
UEFA Euro 2004 players
UEFA European Championship-winning captains
UEFA European Championship-winning players
2005 FIFA Confederations Cup players
Greece international footballers
FIFA Century Club
Super League Greece players
Football League (Greece) players
Greek expatriate sportspeople in England
Greek expatriate sportspeople in Italy
PAOK F.C. presidents
MEPs for Greece 2014–2019
Association football midfielders
MEPs for Greece 2019–2024
People from Filippoi
Greek sportsperson-politicians